Shorea lumutensis is a species of tree in the family Dipterocarpaceae. It is endemic to Peninsular Malaysia.

References

lumutensis
Endemic flora of Peninsular Malaysia
Trees of Peninsular Malaysia
Taxonomy articles created by Polbot